CMS-01 (formerly known as GSAT-12R ) is a communication satellite designed and developed by the Indian Space Research Organisation (ISRO). This satellite is a replacement of the aging GSAT-12 at 83.0° E. This satellite was successfully launched by  PSLV-C50 launch vehicle  on 17 December 2020 at 10:11 UTC.

Satellite 

CMS-01 is considered to be a replacement of the aged satellite GSAT-12. It provides services like tele-education, tele-medicine, disaster management support and Satellite Internet access.

Payloads 
CMS-01 will be replacing services of GSAT-12 in Extended C-band.

Launch 

CMS-01 was successfully launched from a PSLV-C50 launch vehicle on 17 December 2020 at 10:11 UTC.

References 

GSAT satellites
Spacecraft launched by India in 2020